Horace Perkins (born March 15, 1954) is a former American football defensive back. He played for the Kansas City Chiefs in 1979.

References

1954 births
Living people
American football defensive backs
Colorado Buffaloes football players
Kansas City Chiefs players